Esseltub (sometimes called Esseltube) is the name of a typeface family used in the Stockholm Metro. It was designed by Stig Åke Möller and digitalised by Bo Berndal. In the 1980s it was replaced with black and white signs using Helvetica and they are now gradually being replaced by Veolia Transport (formerly Connex) with signs with yellow text on blue background using FF Meta.

See also
 Public signage typefaces

Sans-serif typefaces
Government typefaces